The Ministry of Industry and Trade of the Russian Federation (Minpromtorg, MITRF) is an executive ministry of Government of Russia. Its headquarters are in Moscow.

Functions and responsibilities  
The ministry regulates foreign trade, defense and civil industries, metrology, technical standardization, and aviation technology development. It is a federal executive body.

MITRF is responsible for subsidizing subcontractors to acquire products for government via investment contracts (special investments contracts) and may also forcibly regulate prices (e.g. for steel industry).

MITRF is responsible for contracts involving R&D activities at the expense of government budget. As of 2013 the results of research may be transferred to a subcontractor ownership upon fulfilling (completion) of a contract.

History 

MITRF is a successor to the Soviet Union State Planning Committee (Gosplan).

See also

 Ministry of Trade and Industry
 Government of Russia 
 Ministry of Energy (Russia)

References

External links
Official website  
Official website  

Federal ministries of Russia
Ministries established in 2008
2008 establishments in Russia